Robinsons Brewery is a family-run, regional brewery, founded in 1849 at the Unicorn Inn, Stockport, Cheshire, England.

The company owns around 250 pubs, mostly in North West England.

History
William Robinson purchased the Unicorn Inn from Samuel Hole on 29 September 1838. His eldest son George brewed the first Robinsons Ale there in 1849.

In 1859, Frederic Robinson took over from George and bought a warehouse to the rear of the inn to expand brewing capacity. As a result, Robinsons ale became available at pubs around the Stockport area. To control the quality of ale sold, Frederic began to purchase public houses. From 1878 until his death in 1890, Frederic established twelve pubs which exclusively served his ale. This was the beginning of what was to become an estate of over 300 pubs across the North West of England and North Wales.

The Unicorn Brewery still rests on the foundations of the public house on Lower Hillgate in Stockport.

The brewery continues to be run by the fifth and sixth generations of the Robinson family. The company took over Hartley's Brewery in Ulverston in 1982, closing it and transferring the brewing of Hartley's beers to Stockport in 1991. Robinsons have acquired a number of other breweries over the years, including John Heginbotham, Stalybridge (1915); T. Schofield & Son, Ashton under Lyne (1926); Kays Atlas Brewery, Ardwick (1929) and Bell & Co, Stockport (1949).

The brewery owns many historic pubs, including the New Hall Inn in Bowness on Windermere.

Distribution
The brewery supplies its own estate of just over 300 public houses, mostly in North West England, but including more than 30 in North Wales. It also sells to the free trade. In addition, the company provides casking, kegging and bottling services to other brewers from their site at Bredbury, a short distance from the main Unicorn Brewery.

Brewery

The Unicorn Brewery is a traditional tower type and is one of the few such buildings still being used in its original capacity.

It is possible to tour the brewery at the Robinson's Brewery Visitors Centre in Stockport

Beers
Unicorn (4.2 per cent ABV)
A bitter available on draught or bottled.
Hartleys Cumbria Way (4.1 per cent ABV)
Brewed since 2001, this bitter takes its name from the Cumbria Way footpath linking the towns of Ulverston and Carlisle.
Hartley's XB (4.0 per cent ABV)
A cask-conditioned bitter.
Cwrw'r ddraig aur (4.1 per cent ABV)
Golden Dragon Ale, a bitter brewed for Robinsons' Welsh pubs.
Old Tom (8.5 per cent ABV)
A strong ale that has been brewed since 1899. Available bottled or on draught. Chocolate Tom and Ginger Tom are also available in bottle (6 per cent ABV).
Dizzy Blonde (3.8 per cent ABV)
A golden ale that has been available, following its stint as a seasonal ale, since 2012. Available bottled or on draught.
Double Hop (4.8 per cent ABV)
 An India pale ale.
Unicorn Black (4.1 per cent ABV)
A bottled stout inspired by a 19th-century recipe.
Trooper (4.7 per cent ABV)
A premium bitter brewed since May 2013 to a recipe created by Bruce Dickinson, the singer of Iron Maiden.
Trooper Red 'N' Black Porter (5.8 per cent ABV)
 A porter introduced in September 2016, available on draught (cask and keg) and bottled (6.8 per cent ABV).
Trooper Hallowed (6.0 per cent ABV)
 A limited edition Belgium style beer introduced in July 2017, available in bottle.
Wizard (3.7 per cent ABV)
An amber bitter first brewed in 2015.

Seasonal ales

2014
Hannibal's Nectar (3.9 per cent ABV – Available through January and February)
A ruby bitter available on draught.
Hoptimum Prime (4.1 per cent ABV – Available through March and April)
A golden ale available on draught.
Brazilian (4.2 per cent ABV – Available through May and June)
A blonde ale available on draught.
Citra Pale Ale (3.8 per cent ABV – Available through July and August)
A crisp pale ale inspired by American craft beers, available on draught.
South Island (4.2 per cent ABV – Available through September and October)
A blonde ale brewed with New Zealand Nelson Sauvin hops and available on draught.
Indulgence (4.4 per cent ABV – Available through November and December)
A mahogany coloured old ale available on draught.

2015
Voodoo Dawn (3.9 per cent ABV – Available through January and February)
A ruby bitter available on draught.
Mojo (3.7 per cent ABV – Available through March and April)
An amber ale, brewed with East Kent Goldings and First Gold hops, available on draught.
Dizzy's Twisted Sister (4.0 per cent ABV – Available through July and August)
A blonde ale available on draught.
Hop & Under (4.2 per cent ABV – Available through September and October)
A golden ale inspired by the Rugby World Cup, available on draught.
Frosty Frolics (4.4 per cent ABV – Available through November and December)
A mahogany-coloured ale for the festive season, available on draught.

Gallery

References
Notes

Bibliography

External links

Breweries in England
British companies established in 1849
Companies based in Stockport
Food and drink companies established in 1849